The 1945 Combined Scottish Universities by-election was a by-election held from 9 to 13 April 1945 for the Combined Scottish Universities, a university constituency of the British House of Commons.

Vacancy 
The seat had become vacant on 6 March 1945 when the National Liberal Member of Parliament (MP) George Morrison had resigned by the procedural device of accepting the post of Crown Steward and Bailiff of the Manor of Northstead, a notional 'office of profit under the crown' which is used as a procedural device to enable MPs to resign from the Commons.

Candidates 
Two candidates contested the by-election. The Rector of the University of Glasgow, Sir John Boyd Orr, stood as an independent. He was a doctor and biologist, and founder of the Rowett Research Institute.

The other candidate was R. M. Munro of the National Liberal Party.

Result 
The result was a victory for the Boyd Orr, who won over 70% of the votes. He held the seat until 1946, when he resigned to take up the post of Director of the United Nations Food and Agriculture Organization.

Votes

See also
Combined Scottish Universities (UK Parliament constituency)
1927 Combined Scottish Universities by-election
1934 Combined Scottish Universities by-election
1935 Combined Scottish Universities by-election
1936 Combined Scottish Universities by-election
1938 Combined Scottish Universities by-election
1946 Combined Scottish Universities by-election
List of United Kingdom by-elections (1931–1950)

References

Sources 

1945 in Scotland
1940s elections in Scotland
1945 elections in the United Kingdom
April 1945 events in the United Kingdom
By-elections to the Parliament of the United Kingdom in the Combined Scottish Universities